Dean Richard Lister (born February 13, 1976) is a retired American mixed martial artist (MMA), submission grappler and 4th degree Brazilian jiu-jitsu (BJJ) black belt practitioner and coach. 

A two-time ADCC world Champion, Lister is a former UFC MMA fighter, Pride FC and King of the Cage World Champion where he rose to prominence as a Middleweight Champion. Lister is considered a pioneer of both jiu-jitsu and mixed martial arts.

Early life
Lister grew up in a military family and lived in several South American countries, including Venezuela and Panama. Lister speaks several languages.  He lived in Panama during the U.S. invasion in 1989, and, according to Lister, he was "right in the middle of a serious combat zone". After living in several different cities in the United States, Lister's family settled in San Diego for Lister's high school years, where he attended Hilltop High School.

Career 
Lister often fought as a kid, mostly due to a combination of being the "new kid", a foreigner, and being small for his age. The need to protect himself led Lister to wrestling and martial arts. He started wrestling in high school, and became the high school division wrestling champion and a U.S. National Sambo Champion. Shortly after graduating from high school, Lister visited the Fábio Santos Brazilian Jiu Jitsu Academy in San Diego with his wrestling teammates, and became very interested in the sport. He started competing in Brazilian Jiu Jitsu in 1996, six months after he started training.

From 1997–2003, Lister worked as an instructor for Santos. Lister teaches both beginner and advanced students at Victory MMA in San Diego. The classes typically begin with Dean teaching submission grappling techniques from various grappling arts he's accumulated during the years, followed by sparring.

He maintains that it is "the biggest and most challenging sport that exists". Lister does not favor any particular technique, although he is mostly known for his leg attacks (foot locks and knee locks).

Lister is a high school division wrestling champion, two-time U.S. National Sambo champion, four-time U.S. Machado National Brazilian Jiu Jitsu Champion (weight class and open classes), and a National Gracie Jiu Jitsu champion. He also holds the rank of black belt in Brazilian Jiu-Jitsu, given to him by Jeffrey Higgs, who holds a black belt under Fábio Santos.

Lister was invited three times (2000, 2003, and 2005) to the Abu Dhabi Combat Club (ADCC) championship, a prestigious grappling tournament consisting only of the top 16 grapplers in the world of each weight class. Lister won the Abu Dhabi Absolute Division championship in 2003, as well as two Superfights in 2003 and 2005; in addition, he set a tournament record by defeating 4 of his opponents consecutively (3 by submission) in 2003.

It is worth noting that one of Lister's MMA losses is against Nathan Marquardt, despite previously submitting him in the 2003 ADCC tournament.

Lister was a King of the Cage Middleweight Champion, and defended his title several times before losing to Jeremy Horn in a Light Heavyweight fight. KOTC stripped Dean of his title after the loss, even though it was at a higher weight class. Years later, Lister avenged this loss by submitting Jeremy Horn with a guillotine choke in the TUF 7 finale.

Lister lost a three-round unanimous decision to Yushin Okami at UFC 92 on December 27, 2008, dropping his UFC record to 4–2. He subsequently requested to be released from his UFC contract, and has since signed with the Maximum Fighting Championship.

Dean Lister and Renato Sobral fought to a draw at Metamoris 3 a submission-only jiu-jitsu match.

ADCC
Lister won the 2003 ADCC Absolute World championship and was the 2005 Superfight champion, defeating Jean Jacques Machado. He claimed the gold medal again in 2011 in the under 99 kg division by submitting João Assis in the final by a heel hook. He also submitted jiu-jitsu world champion Rodolfo Vieira, in his weight division, also with a heel hook. At the 2013 ADCC in Beijing, China, Lister defeated Cristiano Lazzarini in the semi-finals of the under 99 kg division by heel hook but would go on to lose on points in the finals to João Assis; In the absolute division Lister submitted both Hideki Sekine and João Gabriel Rocha by heel hook before losing to Marcus Almeida in the semi-finals. Lister also lost to Keenan Cornelius in the bronze medal match both on points.

Dean is one of only 7 people to achieve the ADCC triple crown winning his weight division, absolute division and super fight.

In 2022, Lister earned the honor of being part of the inaugural class of the ADCC Hall of Fame and was the first American to be included.

Ultimate Fighter
Lister's sparring partner and former UFC Light Heavyweight Champion, Tito Ortiz, invited him to be his assistant grappling coach on the third season of the Spike TV reality show, The Ultimate Fighter.

Personal life
Lister was formerly married to model Flavia Mazoni. In April 2021, Lister was hospitalized due to being involved in a hit and run which resulted in a ruptured spleen.

Mixed martial arts record

|-
| Win
| align=center| 13–7
| Michael Knaap
| Submission (heel hook)
| Fightor 1
| 
| align=center| 1
| align=center| N/A
| Charleroi, Belgium
| 
|-
| Win
| align=center| 12–7
| Rodney Moore
| Submission (inverted heel hook)
| Cage Contender 13
| 
| align=center| 3
| align=center| 2:44
| Belfast, Northern Ireland
| 
|-
| Loss
| align=center| 11–7
| Thales Leites
| Decision (unanimous)
| MFC 23
| 
| align=center| 3
| align=center| 5:00
| Edmonton, Alberta, Canada
| 
|-
| Loss
| align=center| 11–6
| Yushin Okami
| Decision (unanimous)
| UFC 92
| 
| align=center| 3
| align=center| 5:00
| Las Vegas, Nevada, United States
| 
|-
| Win
| align=center| 11–5
| Jeremy Horn
| Submission (guillotine choke)
| TUF 7 Finale
| 
| align=center| 1
| align=center| 3:53
| Las Vegas, Nevada, United States
| 
|-
| Win
| align=center| 10–5
| Jordan Radev
| Decision (unanimous)
| UFC 79
| 
| align=center| 3
| align=center| 5:00
| Las Vegas, Nevada, United States
| 
|-
| Loss
| align=center| 9–5
| Nate Marquardt
| Decision (unanimous)
| UFC Fight Night 8
| 
| align=center| 3
| align=center| 5:00
| Hollywood, Florida, United States
| 
|-
| Win
| align=center| 9–4
| Yuki Sasaki
| Decision (unanimous)
| UFC Fight Night 6
| 
| align=center| 3
| align=center| 5:00
| Las Vegas, Nevada, United States
| 
|-
| Win
| align=center| 8–4
| Alessio Sakara
| Submission (triangle choke)
| UFC 60
| 
| align=center| 1
| align=center| 2:20
| Los Angeles, California, United States
| 
|-
| Loss
| align=center| 7–4
| Ricardo Arona
| Decision (unanimous)
| PRIDE Total Elimination 2005
| 
| align=center| 3
| align=center| 5:00
| Osaka, Japan
| 
|-
| Win
| align=center| 7–3
| Akira Shoji
| Submission (triangle choke)
| PRIDE Bushido 6
| 
| align=center| 1
| align=center| 3:13
| Yokohama, Japan
| 
|-
| Loss
| align=center| 6–3
| Amar Suloev
| Decision (split)
| PRIDE Bushido 4
| 
| align=center| 2
| align=center| 5:00
| Nagoya, Japan
| 
|-
| Loss
| align=center| 6–2
| Jeremy Horn
| Decision (majority)
| KOTC 31: King of the Cage 31
| 
| align=center| 4
| align=center| 5:00
| San Jacinto, California, United States
| 
|-
| Win
| align=center| 6–1
| James Lee
| Submission (armbar)
| KOTC 29: Renegades
| 
| align=center| 1
| align=center| N/A
| San Jacinto, California, United States
| 
|-
| Win
| align=center| 5–1
| Brian Sleeman
| Submission (double armbar)
| KOTC 25: Flaming Fury
| 
| align=center| 1
| align=center| 1:14
| San Jacinto, California, United States
| 
|-
| Win
| align=center| 4–1
| Brendan Seguin
| Submission (triangle choke)
| KOTC 16: Double Cross
| 
| align=center| 3
| align=center| 4:37
| San Jacinto, California, United States
| 
|-
| Win
| align=center| 3–1
| Jacen Flynn
| Submission (kimura)
| KOTC 12: Cold Blood
| 
| align=center| 2
| align=center| 4:28
| San Jacinto, California, United States
| 
|-
| Win
| align=center| 2–1
| Jerry Jenkins
| Submission (heel hook)
| KOTC 11: Domination
| 
| align=center| 1
| align=center| 4:24
| San Jacinto, California, United States
| 
|-
| Loss
| align=center| 1–1
| Jacen Flynn
| Decision (split)
| KOTC 7: Wet and Wild
| 
| align=center| 3
| align=center| 5:00
| San Jacinto, California, United States
| 
|-
| Win
| align=center| 1–0
| John Jensen
| Submission (kneebar)
| KOTC 5: Cage Wars
| 
| align=center| 1
| align=center| 1:50
| San Jacinto, California, United States
|

Grappling record

Grappling credentials

ADCC World Submission Wrestling Championships

ADCC 2013
–99 kg: 2nd Place

ADCC 2011
–99 kg: 1st Place

ADCC 2005
Superfight championship: Defeated Jean Jacques Machado.

ADCC 2003
–98 kg:
Absolute/Open weight: 1st Place

ADCC 2002 North American Trials
-99 kg: 1st Place

Record of opponents:

Won: Jean Jacques Machado (pts 9-0), Iiir Latifi (sub-guillotine), Nathan Marquardt (sub-kimura), Saulo Ribeiro (sub-kneelock), Marcio 'Pe De Pano' Cruz (pts 3-0), Alexandre Ferreira 'Cacareco' (sub-heelhook), Masutatsu Yano (sub-rear naked choke), Augusto Ferrari (pts 2-0), Radek Turek (sub-heelhook), Rodolfo Vieira (sub-heelhook), Joao Assis (sub-heelhook), Ricardo "Demente" Abreu (sub-heelhook)
Lost: Xande Ribeiro (pts), Ricardo Almeida (pts), Vinny Magalhaes (pts)
Draw: Xande Ribeiro (Metamoris Pro 2012)

Misc.

High school division wrestling champion.

Two-time national (US) sambo champion.

Four-time Machado National (US) BJJ champion.

National (US) Gracie BJJ champion.

Three-time ADCC submission wrestling World champion

Instructor lineage

Kano Jigoro → Tomita Tsunejiro → Mitsuyo "Count Koma" Maeda → Carlos Gracie, Sr. → Helio Gracie → Rickson Gracie → Fabio Santos → Jeffrey Higgs → Dean Lister

Notes

References

External links
 

1976 births
Living people
American male mixed martial artists
American practitioners of Brazilian jiu-jitsu
American sambo practitioners
American expatriates in Germany
Light heavyweight mixed martial artists
Middleweight mixed martial artists
Mixed martial artists from California
Mixed martial artists utilizing sambo
Mixed martial artists utilizing wrestling
Mixed martial artists utilizing Brazilian jiu-jitsu
People awarded a black belt in Brazilian jiu-jitsu
Sportspeople from San Diego
Ultimate Fighting Championship male fighters
ADCC Hall of Fame inductees